Holbech is a Germanic name, meaning "the low brook" or "the brook in the ravine or hollow". Notable people with the surname include:

 Holbech family, owners of Farnborough Hall
 Charles Holbech, Archdeacon of Coventry from 1873 to 1887
 David Holbache or Holbech (c. 1355–1422/23), Welsh Member of Parliament, founder of Oswestry School
 Niels Peter Holbech, Danish portrait painter
 Thomas Holbech, Vice-Chancellor of Cambridge University in 1677, Master of Emmanuel College from 1676 to 1680
 William Holbech (bishop) (1850–1930), Bishop of St Helena, earlier Archdeacon of Kimberley and Dean of Bloemfontein
 William Holbech (cricketer) (1882–1914), English cricketer, killed in the First World War
 William Holbech (MP) (1748–1812), English Member of Parliament for Banbury

See also
 Holbæk, a town in Zealand, Denmark
 Holbeach, a town in Lincolnshire
 Holbeche House, a manor in Staffordshire
 Holbeck, a district of Leeds, Yorkshire

References